The FloWave TT ocean energy research facility is designed to test physical scale models of marine renewable energy devices, in a combined wave and current environment.

The facility is located at The University of Edinburgh, King's Buildings campus, on Max Born Crescent. It comprises a  diameter circular tank, with 168 active-absorbing wave makers around the circumference, and 28 pumps arranged beneath the raisable floor.

Construction of the facility started late in 2010, and was completed in autumn 2013. The opening was on 5 June 2014, with the Energy Minister Amber Rudd officially opening the facility on 6 August 2014.

FloWave TT is a wholly owned subsidiary of the university, and the £10M construction cost of the facility was primarily funded by Engineering and Physical Sciences Research Council (EPSRC).

Key clients 
A number of developers have publicised that they have completed testing of their devices at FloWave, including:

 Albatern - WaveNET
 QED Naval - SubHub
Five of eight projects from the Wave Energy Scotland Novel Wave Energy Converter Call were tested at FloWave, with the others being tested in the towing tank at University of Strathclyde.
 Quoceant - Ectacti-hull
 Joules Energy 
 Mocean Energy 
 Albatern - WaveNET Series 12
 AWS Ocean Energy - Advanced Archimedes Waveswing
 The Slow Mo Guys

References

External links 
 FloWaveTT Website

Buildings and structures of the University of Edinburgh
Buildings and structures completed in 2014
Engineering and Physical Sciences Research Council
Research institutes in Edinburgh
Wave power
2014 establishments in Scotland